Oliver Charles Cotton (born 20 June 1944) is an English actor, comedian and playwright, known for his prolific work on stage, TV and film. He remains best known for his role as Cesare Borgia in the BBC's 1981 drama series The Borgias.

Early life
Cotton was born in London on 20 June 1944, the son of Ester and Robert Norman Cotton. He trained at the Drama Centre, London.

Career
Cotton worked extensively at the National Theatre Company during the period when Sir Laurence Olivier was its artistic director. Cotton played leading roles in many productions including The Royal Hunt of the Sun, Rosencrantz and Guildenstern Are Dead, Much Ado in About Nothing, As You Like It, Peter Brook’s Oedipus, In His Own Write and many others.

At the Royal Court in London, Cotton has played leads in many productions including The Local Stigmatic, The Duchess of Malfi, Man is Man, The Tutor by Bertholt Brecht, Lear and Bingo by Edward Bond. He was a founder member of Joint Stock appearing in the company's  inaugural production The Speakers by Heathcote Williams.

For the Royal Shakespeare Company he has played leading roles in Granville Barker's The Marrying of Ann Leete, Henry VI, Edward IV, Richard III, The Plain Dealer, Some Americans Abroad by Richard Nelson, and as the Mayor in Brand by Ibsen in 2003.

In the West End he has starred in The Homecoming by Harold Pinter, Children of A Lesser God by Mark Medoff, Benefactors by Michael Frayn, An Ideal Husband by Oscar Wilde, Life x 3 by Yasmina Reza (RNT transfer), "Passion Play" (by Peter Nichols). He also played King Lear at the Southwark Playhouse and performed as Malvolio in a (historically correct all-male) production Twelfth Night at the reconstruction of Shakespeare's Globe. At the Old Vic, under the directorship of Kevin Spacey, he appeared as Seth Lord in The Philadelphia Story, as Northumberland in Richard II, and as Dr Finache in A Flea in Her Ear. In 2010 he played Henry IV in Shakespeare's Henry IV at the Globe Theatre. At Chichester he has appeared as Jim Casy in The Grapes Of Wrath in 2009 and as Arturo Santaniello in The Syndicate. In 2012, he played Victor Velasco in a major tour of Barefoot in the Park. In 2013 he played Jim in Passion Play by Peter Nichols at the Duke of York's Theatre – and in 2014 starred as Billy in his own play Daytona at the Theatre Royal Haymarket.

His numerous TV appearances have included The Borgias (Cesare Borgia), David Copperfield, The Year of The French, The Party, Room at the Bottom, Space:1999, Redemption, Poirot, The Camomile Lawn, Westbeach, Sharpes Battle, Rhodes, All Quiet on the Preston Front, Innocents, Judge John Deed, Inspector Lynley, Waking The Dead, Murder Investigation Team, Beastly Games, Margaret, Money, Ripper Street and Lovejoy.

His films include Here We Go Round The Mulberry Bush, The Day Christ Died, Oliver Twist, Firefox, The Sicilian, Eleni, Hiding Out, Christopher Columbus, Son of the Pink Panther, The Innocent Sleep, Phoenix Blue, The Opium War, Beowulf, Baby Blue, The Dancer Upstairs, Shanghai Knights, Bone Hunter, Rain Dogs, Colour Me Kubrick, Pope Joan, The Dark Knight Rises, Gangs of Tooting Broadway, A Long Time Coming.

Writing
For the stage his writing includes: The Enoch Show (Royal Court), Scrabble (National Theatre), Wet Weather Cover (King's Head Theatre), Daytona, Dessert, Sans Souci. His TV and film scripts include: A Touch of Frost, Diamond Geezer, Trace, The Intruder, Singing for Stalin, Sofa, Wet Weather Cover: The Movie, Peeping Through and The English Game.

Filmography

Film

Television

Video game

References

External links 
 

1944 births
Alumni of the Drama Centre London
English male film actors
English male stage actors
English male television actors
Living people